is a former Japanese artistic gymnast, who won seven world titles and three Olympic gold medals between 1968 and 1979. In retirement, he became a leading Japanese coach. He also served as sports director of the Nippon Sport Science University and vice president of the Japan Gymnastics Association. In 2006, Kenmotsu was inducted into the International Gymnastics Hall of Fame.

Kenmotsu was 20 years and 8 months old in October 1968 when he became the youngest Japanese artistic gymnast in history to win an Olympic gold medal after the team event finals at the 1968 Summer Olympics in Mexico City, and he held on to that longstanding record for almost 48 years until recently when it was finally broken by Kenzō Shirai, who in August 2016 acquired the honour when only 19 years and 11 months old, at the 2016 Summer Olympics in Rio de Janeiro–also after the team event finals. Coincidentally, they had both similarly won one other Olympic medal, each an individual event bronze–Kenmotsu on the horizontal bar and Shirai on vault–at their respective first Olympic Games.

References

External links
 Kenmotsu(Technique of parallel bars)
 

1948 births
Living people
Japanese male artistic gymnasts
Gymnasts at the 1968 Summer Olympics
Gymnasts at the 1972 Summer Olympics
Gymnasts at the 1976 Summer Olympics
Olympic gymnasts of Japan
Olympic gold medalists for Japan
Olympic medalists in gymnastics
Nippon Sport Science University alumni
Medalists at the 1976 Summer Olympics
Medalists at the 1972 Summer Olympics
Medalists at the 1968 Summer Olympics
Medalists at the World Artistic Gymnastics Championships
Olympic silver medalists for Japan
Olympic bronze medalists for Japan
Sportspeople from Okayama Prefecture
20th-century Japanese people
21st-century Japanese people